The Diligent was a  74-gun ship of the line of the French Navy. She was funded by a don des vaisseaux donation from the headmasters of the Posts, and built on a design by Antoine Groignard.

From 1773, she was part of the Saint Malo squadron. She was ordered demolished after only six years, and broken up in Brest in 1780.

External links 

Ships of the line of the French Navy
1763 ships
Don des vaisseaux